The  is a constituency that represents Yamagata Prefecture in the House of Councillors in the Diet of Japan. Councillors are elected to the house by single non-transferable vote (SNTV) for six-year terms. Since the establishment of the current House of Councillors electoral system in 1947, the district has elected two Councillors, one each at elections held every three years. It has 937,920 registered voters as of September 2015.

The Councillors currently representing Yamagata are:
 Koichi Kishi (Liberal Democratic Party (LDP)); a Councillor since 1998, was elected to his third term in 2010, which will end in 2016.
  (LDP); elected to her first term in 2013, which will end in 2019.

Elected Councillors

Election results

References 

Districts of the House of Councillors (Japan)